In group theory, the Pohlig–Hellman algorithm, sometimes credited as the Silver–Pohlig–Hellman algorithm, is a special-purpose algorithm for computing discrete logarithms in a finite abelian group whose order is a smooth integer.

The algorithm was introduced by Roland Silver, but first published by Stephen Pohlig and Martin Hellman (independent of Silver).

Groups of prime-power order 
As an important special case, which is used as a subroutine in the general algorithm (see below), the Pohlig–Hellman algorithm applies to groups whose order is a prime power. The basic idea of this algorithm is to iteratively compute the -adic digits of the logarithm by repeatedly "shifting out" all but one unknown digit in the exponent, and computing that digit by elementary methods.

Input. A cyclic group  of order  with generator  and an element .
Output. The unique integer  such that .
 Initialize 
 Compute . By Lagrange's theorem, this element has order .
 For all , do:
 Compute . By construction, the order of this element must divide , hence .
 Using the baby-step giant-step algorithm, compute  such that . It takes time .
 Set .
 Return .

The general algorithm 
In this section, we present the general case of the Pohlig–Hellman algorithm. The core ingredients are the algorithm from the previous section (to compute a logarithm modulo each prime power in the group order) and the Chinese remainder theorem (to combine these to a logarithm in the full group).

(Again, we assume the group to be cyclic, with the understanding that a non-cyclic group must be replaced by the subgroup generated by the logarithm's base element.)

Input. A cyclic group  of order  with generator , an element , and a prime factorization .
Output. The unique integer  such that . 
 For each , do:
 Compute . By Lagrange's theorem, this element has order .
 Compute . By construction, .
 Using the algorithm above in the group , compute  such that .
 Solve the simultaneous congruence The Chinese remainder theorem guarantees there exists a unique solution .
 Return .

Complexity

Notes

References

Number theoretic algorithms